The 1967–68 season was the 59th year of football played by Dundee United, and covers the period from 1 July 1967 to 30 June 1968. United finished in eleventh place in the First Division.

Match results
Dundee United played a total of 42 competitive matches during the 1967–68 season.

Legend

All results are written with Dundee United's score first.
Own goals in italics

First division

Scottish Cup

League Cup

References

See also
 1967–68 in Scottish football

Dundee United F.C. seasons
Dundee United